Hyantis is a monotypic nymphalid butterfly genus. Its sole species is Hyantis hodeva, which is found in New Guinea. It is uncertain which tribe this butterfly should be placed within.

Distribution 
The species is distributed in the following islands: New Guinea, Waigeo, Misool, Yapen and D'Entrecasteaux Islands.

Morphology 

The species has three pairs of six well-developed ocellus on the ventral side of the wings: one pair on the forewings near the apex and two pairs on the hindwings. Each eyespot is large and bordered with yellow, and the black "pupil" has plural small white dots inside. This species is similar to Taenaris, but can be easily identified from that genus, which generally has only two or four ocellus with single white spot on its hindwings. 

This species is also unique in having a closed discoidal cell on each hindwing. This morphological character is also shared by the genus Morphopsis and is generally found in the subfamily Satyrinae.

The early stage is unknown.

Mimicry 
This species is very similar to Taenaris species, especially T. catops. Hyantis is also imitated by Mycalesis drusillodes (Satyrini), Taenaris by  Elymnias agondas (Elymniini). It should be considered that these species may be involved in some kind of mimicry complex, but the details are not known.

Systematics 
The genus Hyantis (and putatively related Morphopsis) has traditionally been placed within tribe Amathusiini, even though there are differences in wing venation structures. Recent molecular phylogenetic analyses have been gradually resolved the confusion in the phylogenetic relationships in the subfamily Satyrinae, but the phylogenetic status of this genus remains confused, with several methods of analysis showing different results. For example: within the clade of Melanitini + Dirini (Peña & Wahlberg 2008), appears to be related with Elymnias , as sister to Amathusiini (Wahlberg et al. 2009, Fig.5s) and within Zetherini (Wahlberg et al. 2009, Fig.3s and Penz 2017). In any case, further studies are needed to clarify the phylogenetic position of this genus.

Classification 
This species contains 3 to 5 subspecies.

 Hyantis Hewitson, 1862
 Hyantis hodeva Hewitson, 1862
 Hyantis hodeva hodeva Hewitson, 1862
 Hyantis hodeva helvola Stichel, 1905 (syn. Hyantis hodeva hageni Röber, 1903)
 Hyantis hodeva fulginosa Grose-Smith, 1898 (syn. Hyantis hodeva xanthophthalma Röber, 1903)
 Hyantis hodeva emarginata Fruhstorfer, 1916

Notes

References

Citations

Sources

External links 

 Hyantis hodeva Hewitson 1862 at the Tree of Life web project
 Hyantis Hewitson, 1862 at Lepidoptera and some other life forms
 Genus Hyantis Hewitson, [1862] in the Web Monograph about tribe Amathusini (in Japanese)

Amathusiini
Monotypic butterfly genera
Butterflies described in 1862
Taxa named by William Chapman Hewitson
Nymphalidae genera